Stories from our neighbourhood (Arabic title حكايات حارتنا), also known as Fountain and Tomb, is a collection of stories by the Egyptian author Naguib Mahfouz, who was awarded the Nobel Literature Prize in 1988. The collection, published in 1975, takes place in Cairo in the 1920s, and consist of 77 autobiographical stories during the social unrest occurring in the country at the time.

1975 short story collections
Novels by Naguib Mahfouz
Cairo in fiction
Fiction set in the 1920s